The Public Land Corps (PLC) is a work and education program for young people and veterans that is run by the United States land management agencies in association with state conservation and service corps.  The objective is the rehabilitation and restoration of public land resources and infrastructure.  The Public Land Corps was authorized by the National and Community Service Trust Act on May 27, 1993, H.R. 2328. The 21st Century Conservation Service Corps Act in 2019 allowed Public Land Corps to partner with more federal agencies on conservation and restoration projects and created the Indian Youth Service Corps within the Public Land Corps.

The state organizations recruit young Americans between ages 16 to 30 to join the Public Land Corps.  The Corps offers 
meaningful, full-time, productive work in a natural or cultural resource setting;
a mix of work experience, basic and life skills, education, training and support services; and
the opportunity to develop citizenship values and skills through service to their community and the United States.
a period of non-competitive hiring status for 2 years from the completion of their most recent Corps service.

Participants repair or construct parks trails, removing invasive species, restore historic buildings, and conduct other projects. 

Public Land Corps programs are eligible for AmeriCorps grants.

Participating conservation and service corps
Nationwide
Student Conservation Association
American Conservation Experience
Alaska
Serve Alaska Youth Corps
Arizona
Coconino Rural Environment Corps
Southwest Conservation Corps
California
American Conservation Experience
California Conservation Corps
Conservation Corps North Bay
Los Angeles Conservation Corps
Colorado
Colorado Range Rider Youth Corps
Southwest Conservation Corps
Western Colorado Conservation Corps
Mile High Youth Corps
Rocky Mountain Youth Corps
Idaho
Idaho Conservation Corps
Maine
Maine Conservation Corps
Maryland
Civic Works
Appalachian Forest Heritage Area
Minnesota
Minnesota Conservation Corps
Nevada
Nevada Conservation Corps

New Mexico

Rocky Mountain Youth Corps
North Carolina
American Conservation Experience
Oregon
Northwest Youth Corps
Texas
American Conservation Experience
Texas Conservation Corps at American YouthWorks
Utah
American Conservation Experience
Utah Conservation Corps
Vermont
Vermont Youth Conservation Corps
Washington
EarthCorps
Washington Conservation Corps, Department of Ecology
Washington Conservation Corps, Department of Natural Resources
West Virginia
Citizens Conservation Corps of West Virginia
Appalachian Forest Heritage Area

References

National Park Service